Jersey Cricket Board is the official governing body of the sport of cricket in Jersey.  Jersey Cricket Board is Jersey's representative at the International Cricket Council (ICC) and is an associate member since 2007 and has been a member of that body since 2005. It is also a member of the European Cricket Council. Headquarter of Jersey Cricket Board is in St. Helier, Jersey.

In March 2020, the board suspended all cricket activity until 1 June 2020 at the earliest, due to the coronavirus pandemic.

References

External links
Official site 
Official site of Jersey Cricket Board
Cricinfo Jersey

Cricket administration
Cricket in Jersey